Fausto Vallejo y Figueroa (born May 17, 1949 in Morelia, Michoacán) is a Mexican lawyer, politician, a member of the Institutional Revolutionary Party (PRI) and former governor of Michoacán. He has served three times as mayor of Morelia, Michoacán (1994–1995, 2002–2004 and 2008–2011). On June 18, 2014, he announced he was stepping down as governor to take care of his health.

Vallejo ran for the governorship of Michoacán in the November 13, 2011, gubernatorial election. According to the official results he won the election with 35.39% of the votes, Vallejo narrowly defeated PAN gubernatorial candidate Luisa María Calderón, the sister of Mexican President Felipe Calderón, by less than 3% of the vote. Calderón, who led most opinion polls prior to the election, alleged that drug traffickers based in Michoacán had helped tip the election in Fausto Vallejo's favor. A third candidate, Silvano Aureoles of the Party of the Democratic Revolution (PRD), placed a distant third with 29%.

Fausto Vallejo stepped down temporarily for health reasons on March 7, 2013, and Jesús Reyna García took over as interim governor. Vallejo returned to work on March 18 but participated in only two public events before asking for indefinite leave on April 9. After a liver transplant, he returned to work on October 21, 2013.

On behalf of federal government, Alfredo Castillo Cervantes cracked down on drug trafficking and violence in January 2014; Reyna García was arrested for possible ties to the Knights Templar Cartel in April. He was convicted a month later, and Vallejo announced that he planned to ask for permission to miss work for a health check. 

In August 2014, Rodrigo Vallejo Mora, son of the governor, was arrested after a video surfaced of him meeting with Servando Gómez Martínez, fugitive leader of the Knights Templar Cartel, a criminal organization based in Michoacán. Governor Vallejo stated, "[D]icen por ahí que hay videos que involucran a alguien de mi familia con los criminales. Quiero decirles que en mi familia no hay delincuentes". ("They say that there are videos that show a member of my family with criminals. I want to tell you that there are no delincuents in my family.") He resigned on June 18 for health reasons.

External links
Official Web Page
Official Facebook profile

See also
 List of municipal presidents of Morelia

References

20th-century Mexican lawyers
Governors of Michoacán
People from Morelia
Politicians from Michoacán
1949 births
Living people
Institutional Revolutionary Party politicians
20th-century Mexican politicians
21st-century Mexican politicians
Universidad Michoacana de San Nicolás de Hidalgo alumni